The Science and Industry Museum in Manchester, England, traces the development of science, technology and industry with emphasis on the city's achievements in these fields. The museum is part of the Science Museum Group, a non-departmental public body of the Department for Digital, Culture, Media and Sport, having merged with the National Science Museum in 2012.

There are extensive displays on the theme of transport (cars, railway locomotives and rolling stock), power (water, electricity, steam and gas engines), Manchester's sewerage and sanitation, textiles, communications and computing.

The museum is an Anchor Point of the European Route of Industrial Heritage and is on the site of the world's first passenger railway station – Manchester Liverpool Road – which opened as part of the Liverpool & Manchester Railway in 1830. The railway station frontage and 1830 warehouse are both Grade I listed.

History 

The museum was called the North Western Museum of Science and Industry when it opened in 1969 in temporary premises on Grosvenor Street in Chorlton-on-Medlock. It had close ties with the University of Manchester Institute of Science & Technology, having mostly grown out of the Department of History of Science & Technology, and UMIST's Richard L. Hills was the museum's first lecturer in charge.

In 1978, Greater Manchester Council purchased the earliest part of the former Liverpool Road station from British Rail, which had been closed in 1975. The council paid the nominal sum of £1 for the site. The museum opened at this site on 15 September 1983 and later expanded to include the whole of the former station.

Since 2007 the museum has organised an annual science festival in Manchester.

In 2014, it was announced Sally MacDonald would become the director. MacDonald left her role as head of collections at University College London and succeeded Jean Franczyk as director.

In July 2021, the permanent closure of the Air and Space Hall was announced. A spokeswoman has also said that the objects displayed would be returned to their original owners, and the objects owned by the museum, would be displayed in future exhibits. The collection was dispersed over the winter of 2021-2.

Exhibitions 
Exhibits at the Science and Industry Museum include:

Computing and communications
 A replica of the Manchester Baby
 A Connected Earth gallery that tells the history of communications in Manchester and the North West of England opened in October 2007.

Locomotives

Ericsson's Novelty – A replica incorporating parts from the original locomotive of 1829
British Rail Class 77 No. 27001, liveried as Nederlandse Spoorwegen (Dutch Railways) No. 1505, Ariadne – A 1.5 kV DC electric locomotive built by Metropolitan-Vickers in 1953
South African Railways GL class Garratt No. 2352 – Built in 1929 by Beyer, Peacock & Company, Manchester
Pakistan Railways 4–4–0  No. 3157 (broad gauge) Originally built for North Western Railway of India by Vulcan Foundry, Newton-le-Willows (around 1911–1914).

Former galleries

Previous permanent exhibition galleries which have now been decommissioned include:
 Electricity Gallery - generation, distribution and use of electricity
 Gas Gallery - past to present look at the gas industry
 Underground Manchester - sanitation and water supply
 A space-themed gallery, with exhibits encompassing historical space flight, space science and also science-fiction, formerly took up the majority of the upper balcony of the Air and Space hall.  This was eventually considered outdated and removed in its entirety.

Some past exhibitions
 Body Worlds 4 between 22 February and 29 June 2008
 LMR 57 Lion Britain's oldest steamable locomotive (in the Museum of Liverpool since 2007)
Stephenson's Rocket – from 25 September 2018 to 8 September 2019

Railway 

Until 2018, demonstration passenger trains ran within the museum grounds on selected dates. Trains were hauled by the museum's two operational steam locomotives:
Planet – A replica of Robert Stephenson & Company's Planet class locomotive, built by the Friends of the Museum of Science and Industry in 1992. The original locomotive was constructed in 1830 and hauled trains on the Liverpool and Manchester Railway.
Agecroft No. 1 – An 0–4–0 saddle tank built by Robert Stephenson & Hawthorns in 1948 for use at Agecroft Power Station. Restored to working order in 2011.

The museum's railway line was connected to the national rail network near Ordsall Lane Junction. However, construction by Network Rail of the Ordsall Chord railway link, which was completed in 2017, severed this connection and significantly shortened the museum's running line despite a legal battle to save it.

As of 2019, railway operations at the museum were suspended indefinitely.

Industrial machines 

The museum exhibits the large collection of stationary steam engines, hot air engines, diesel engines, hydraulic pumps, large electric generators and other similar machines. Most of these machines are operational and occasionally can be seen running. This exhibit includes the last stationary steam engine built to power a mill.

There is also the exhibit of spinning and weaving machines, covering all the steps from wool to textile. These machines are run for a few minutes at scheduled times.

Adjacent St John's Quarter 

The museum is adjacent to a £1 billion redevelopment area on the former site of Granada Studios. Work on the area, which will be known as St John's Quarter, is expected to be completed by 2022. The Manchester International Festival's new Factory venue is set to open alongside the MSI at the end of 2019 as part of the redevelopment.

The MSI have been granted planning permission to build a new Special Exhibition Gallery on the ground floor of the New Warehouse. Architectural firm Carmody Groarke won a competition to design the new gallery which is set to be complete by October 2020.

In July 2016 the council stated that, along with development partner Allied London, they had been in talks with the MSI "exploring how the presence of Factory opens up new possibilities for revitalising the whole area below Deansgate as a creative hub, with a joined up and extensive public realm. MSI's own developments plans are being aligned with this creative vision and the museum itself will become part of the creative public realm, with MSI's creative science offer balancing the creative and cultural production of Factory."

See also 
Museum of Transport, Greater Manchester
List of museums in Greater Manchester
List of transport museums
List of aerospace museums

References

Further reading

External links 

 Official Website
 Aeroflight List of Aero collection
 Entry in 24 Hour Museum

Museums in Manchester
European Route of Industrial Heritage Anchor Points
Museums sponsored by the Department for Digital, Culture, Media and Sport
History museums in Greater Manchester
Science museums in England
Technology museums in the United Kingdom
Industry museums in England
Transport museums in England
1983 establishments in England
Science Museum Group